Tırnak is a village in Gülnar district of  Mersin Province, Turkey. At  it is situated in Toros Mountains. The population of the village was 112  as of 2012.

References

Villages in Gülnar District